M. Kandaswamy is an Indian politician belonging to the Indian National Congress. He was elected from the Embalam constituency in 2016 Puducherry Legislative Assembly election. He became the minister of Social Welfare, Women and Child Development, Adi-Dravidar Welfare, Backward Classes Welfare, Co-operation, Civil Supplies & Consumer Affairs, Labour and Employment, Pollution Control, Science, Technology and Environment and Port in V. Narayanasamy government.

References

Indian National Congress politicians from Puducherry
Puducherry politicians
Living people
Puducherry MLAs 2016–2021
State cabinet ministers of Puducherry
Year of birth missing (living people)